Events from the year 1802 in the United States.

Incumbents

Federal Government 
 President: Thomas Jefferson (DR-Virginia)
 Vice President: Aaron Burr (DR-New York)
 Chief Justice: John Marshall (Virginia)
 Speaker of the House of Representatives: Nathaniel Macon (DR-North Carolina)
 Congress: 7th

Events

 March 16 – Congress authorizes the establishment of the United States Military Academy at West Point, New York.
 April 19 – The Judiciary Act of 1802 is enacted, reorganizing the federal court system.
 April 30 – The Enabling Act of 1802 authorizes the creation of Ohio from the Northwest Territory and sets a precedent for the creation of future states from the western territories.
 June 1 – William Thornton is appointed the first superintendent of the United States Patent Office.
 July 4 – At West Point, New York the United States Military Academy opens.
 October 2 – First Barbary War: Fighting ends between Sweden and Tripoli. The United States also negotiates peace, but war continues over the size of compensation.
 October 12 – Joseph Gardner Swift and Simeon Magruder Levy become the first graduates of the United States Military Academy.

Undated
 U.S. House of Representatives elections: 142 representatives are elected, 36 more than the 7th Congress, following reapportionment from the 1800 United States Census.

Ongoing
 First Barbary War (1801–1805)

Births
 January 22 – Richard Upjohn, Gothic architect (died 1878)
 February 4 – Mark Hopkins, educator and president of Williams College (died 1887)
 February 11 – Lydia Maria Child, abolitionist, women's rights activist, novelist and journalist (died 1880)
 February 21 – George D. Ramsay, 6th Chief of Ordnance of the United States Army (died 1882)
 March 16 – George A. McCall, Union Army brigadier general (died 1868)
 April 2 – Archibald Dixon, U.S. Senator from Kentucky from 1852 to 1855 (died 1876)
 April 4 – Dorothea Dix, mental health reformer (died 1887)
 May 10 – James Westcott, U.S. Senator from Florida from 1845 to 1849 (died 1880)
 June 10 – James W. Bradbury, U.S. Senator from Maine from 1847 to 1853 (died 1901)
 June 30 – Benjamin Fitzpatrick, U.S. Senator from Alabama from 1848 to 1849 and from 1853 to 1861 (died 1869)
 July 1 – Gideon Welles, 24th United States Secretary of the Navy (died 1878)
 July 9 – Thomas Davenport, inventor and blacksmith (died 1851)
 July 21 – David Hunter, Union Army major general (died 1886)
 August 10 – Dixon Hall Lewis, U.S. Senator from Alabama from 1844 to 1848 (died 1848)
 September 4 – Marcus Whitman, physician and missionary (died 1847)
 November 5 – James F. Trotter, U.S. Senator from Mississippi in 1838 (died 1866)
 November 9 – Elijah Parish Lovejoy, newspaper publisher and abolitionist (died 1837)
 November 19 – Solomon Foot, Vermont politician (died 1866)
 December 2 – Melancthon S. Wade, Union Army general (died 1868)

Deaths
 February 26 – Esek Hopkins, Commander in Chief of the Continental Navy during the Revolution (born 1718)
 May 22 – Martha Washington, the wife of George Washington, the first president of the United States (born 1731)
 July 6 – Daniel Morgan, soldier and United States Representative from Virginia (born 1736)
 December 31 – Francis Lewis, signer of the Declaration of Independence from New York (born 1713)

See also
Timeline of United States history (1790–1819)

References

Further reading
 A Register of Marriages and Deaths, 1802. The Pennsylvania Magazine of History and Biography, Vol. 24, No. 2 (1900), pp. 207–211
 W. L. McAtee. Journal of Benjamin Smith Barton on a Visit to Virginia, 1802. Castanea, Vol. 3, No. 7/8 (November – December, 1938), pp. 85–117
 
 
C. Richard Arena. Philadelphia-Mississippi Valley trade and deposit closure of 1802. Pennsylvania History, Vol. 30, No. 1 (January 1963), pp. 28–45
 
 
 
 Howard A. Ohline. Georgetown, South Carolina: Racial Anxieties and Militant Behavior, 1802. The South Carolina Historical Magazine, Vol. 73, No. 3 (July, 1972), pp. 130–140

External links
 

 
1800s in the United States
United States
United States
Years of the 19th century in the United States